József Varga (born 18 March 1999) is a Hungarian professional footballer who plays for Diósgyőri VTK.

Club statistics

Updated to games played as of 19 May 2018.

References

1999 births
Living people
Hungarian footballers
Association football forwards
Diósgyőri VTK players
Nemzeti Bajnokság I players